Is the 2011–12 Gimnàstic de Tarragona season.  The club plays in two tournaments: the Segunda División and the Copa del Rey.

Squad

Youth squad
Youth players with first team experience

Technical staff

Transfers

In

Out

Player statistics

Squad statistics 
Last updated on 4 June 2012.

|-
|colspan="14"|Players who have left the club after the start of the season:

|}

Top scorers
Updated on 28 May

Disciplinary record
Updated on 4 June 2012

Season results

Segunda División

Results summary

Competitive

Pre-season

2010–11 Copa Catalunya

2011–12 Copa Catalunya

Segunda División

Copa del Rey

2011–12 Kits

The current kits are manufactured by Nàstic, a brand of the club.

References

 

2011–12 in Catalan football
Spanish football clubs 2011–12 season
Gimnàstic de Tarragona seasons